The 2017 Gubernatorial Election in Yaroslavl Oblast was held on 10 September 2017.

Background
28 July 2016, the Governor Sergey Yastrebov, went into early retirement. The acting Governor was appointed Dmitry Mironov.

Candidates

Registered

Not registered
Oleg Vinogradov (Yabloko) — former Vice Governor of Yaroslavl Oblast.

Opinion polls

Result

See also
2017 Russian gubernatorial elections

References

2017 elections in Russia
2017 Russian gubernatorial elections
Politics of Yaroslavl Oblast